Fleming Cayce Burns (August 31, 1890 – July 22, 1915) was a superintendent of the Oneonta Oil & Fertilizer Company. He was a college football player for the Auburn Tigers and was selected All-Southern in 1912.

He died from tetanus in New Decatur, Alabama on July 22, 1915, after an oil mill construction accident which injured two fingers on his left hand.

References

External links
 

American football guards
1915 deaths
1890 births
Sportspeople from Florence, Alabama
Auburn Tigers football players
All-Southern college football players
Deaths from tetanus
Industrial accident deaths